The 2013–14 Northwestern Wildcats women's basketball team represented Northwestern University during the 2013–14 NCAA Division I women's basketball season. The Wildcats, led by sixth year head coach Joe McKeown, played their home games at the Welsh-Ryan Arena and were a member of the Big Ten Conference. They finished the season with a record of 17–16 overall, 5–11 in Big Ten play for a 3 way tie finish for 8th place. They lost in the first round in the 2014 Big Ten Conference women's basketball tournament to Ohio State. They were invited to the 2014 Women's National Invitation Tournament which they defeated Ball State in the first round, IUPUI in the second round before losing to Indiana in the third round.

Roster

Schedule

|-
!colspan=9| Exhibition

|-
!colspan=9| Regular Season

|-
!colspan=9| 2014 Big Ten Conference women's basketball tournament

|-
!colspan=9| 2014 WNIT

Source

See also
2013–14 Northwestern Wildcats men's basketball team

References

Northwestern Wildcats women's basketball seasons
Northwestern
2014 Women's National Invitation Tournament participants
Northwestern Wild
Northwestern Wild